Derek Handley (born 1978) is a New Zealand entrepreneur, speaker, and author who was born in Hong Kong. With his brother Geoffrey Handley, he co-founded the global mobile marketing and media company The Hyperfactory and the mobile advertising network Snakk Media. He is the founder and managing partner of Aera VC, and founder of Wiser Conversations, "a series of virtual conversations designed to help us reflect and respond to our new surreality", created as a response to the pandemic.

Early life and education
Handley was born in Hong Kong, and grew up in New Zealand. He attended Victoria University of Wellington and Massey University, and undertook the MIT Sloan School of Management executive program.

Career

Early career
At 22, Handley founded a global online sports-betting business called Feverpitch which fizzled out, he listed on the venture-style New Capital Market of New Zealand Stock Exchange (NZX), becoming New Zealand's youngest managing director of a listed company. He subsequently led a merger of several companies in the New Zealand childcare sector and formed Kidicorp Group Limited, which backed into Feverpitch.

Handley also served as chair of Booktrack in 2012-2013, a company developing e-reader technology incorporating soundtracks for e-books. The company was also backed by Peter Thiel.

In 2013, Handley was named an adjunct executive professor for Auckland University of Technology in New Zealand. Currently, he is studying religion at the Harvard University Extension School.

Mobile industry ventures
Derek co-founded the global mobile technology and media company The Hyperfactory in 2001, prior to the proliferation of internet-enabled mobile handsets. The company went on to win numerous awards. It was subsequently acquired by media conglomerate Meredith Corporation (NYSE:MDP) though it is uncertain whether this was a successful purchase for Meredith.  Handley's work with The Hyperfactory led to his listing on the 'Silicon Alley 100' of the most influential technology people in New York.

In 2011, he co-founded the mobile advertising network Snakk Media, which listed on the NZ Alternative Exchange (NZAX) in 2013, becoming one of the first public B-Corporations. Handley stepped down from the Snakk Board in 2015. The company was later placed into voluntary administration due to financial difficulty in 2018, then later removed from liquidation in 2020.

Chief Technology Officer of New Zealand
Handley's application for the governmental role of Chief Technology Officer (CTO) of New Zealand became a political controversy when he applied in 2018. The role was to be created under the auspices of Government Digital Services Minister Clare Curran. On 24 August 2018, New Zealand Prime Minister Jacinda Ardern dismissed Curran from the Cabinet after it became clear Curran had met Handley in February at her Beehive office to discuss his interest in the vacant CTO role. Curran had failed to disclose the meeting in her ministerial diary and to inform staff or officials about it (the second meeting she had failed to disclose). Curran apologised to the Prime Minister for her actions and eventually resigned as a Minister.

In September 2018, Handley announced that he had been offered, and had accepted, the CTO role in August. Soon after, the Government announced that it would not be proceeding with the role after concerns were raised by the business community and NZ entrepreneurs over Derek’s selection and suitability, and paid Handley compensation of $107,000 (three months' pay plus reimbursement for moving costs). Handley said he was "deeply disappointed" by the process but the Government's decision to halt it was understandable.

Recent and current roles
Handley is currently General Partner with Aera VC, a fund which invests in deep-tech ventures underpinned by social impact and the UN Sustainable Development Goals. He launched the fund at Wharton Business School, where he was named Social Innovator in Residence.

In 2013, he joined the board of Sky Television, a public company on the Australian Stock Exchange, stepping down from the role in January 2021. He is also the founding CEO of Richard Branson's The B Team. He remained with the B Team as entrepreneur-in-residence and adviser until 2015.

Awards and honours
In September 2006, Handley was a finalist in the Bayer Innovator Awards (Information Technology and Communications Category).

In October 2009, he received the 2009 EY Young Entrepreneur of the Year Award.

In December 2010, he was named finalist for the New Zealand Herald Business Leader of the Year.

In October 2011, he was listed on the 'Silicon Alley 100' of the most influential technology people in New York. That same year he was named a New Zealand 2011 Sir Peter Blake Leader by the Sir Peter Blake Trust, and became a World Class New Zealander.

In March 2015, he was named one of 100 visionary leaders by the Young Presidents' Organization, a global network of business leaders who have achieved success at an early age.

In April 2015, he was year named a Distinguished Young Alumni of Victoria University of Wellington (Wellington, New Zealand).

In September 2015, he was named in the world's top 100 influential leaders by the Association to Advance Collegiate Schools of Business, a global accrediting body and membership association for business schools.

In November 2015, he was named one of the top 10 most influential social entrepreneurs on Twitter (by Chivas' The Venture, US).

In November 2016, the Wharton Social Impact Initiative, at Wharton School of the University of Pennsylvania invited Handley to join the David Nazarian Social Innovator in Residence Program, naming him the third "Innovator in Residence" to visit the school.

Personal life
Handley has a son with his wife, Maya. During the process of applying for the Chief Technology Officer position, he moved his family back to New Zealand to live in Auckland.

In November 2017, Handley was granted New Zealand citizenship by the Minister for Internal Affairs, Tracey Martin, under the "exceptional circumstances" provision. The provision was required because he had not spent enough time in New Zealand to meet the usual requirements to become a citizen, since he was 865 days short. Handley argued that he did not meet the requirements because he frequently travelled for business.

References

MIT Sloan School of Management alumni
New Zealand businesspeople
Victoria University of Wellington alumni
1978 births
Living people
Harvard Extension School alumni